Natabara Samantaray was an Odia writer and literary critic. Some of his known literary historical works are Odia Sahityara Itihasa (1803-1920), Adhunika Odia Sahityara Bhittibhumi and Vyasakabi Fakirmohan. His critical review included works of many noted Odia authors like Fakir Mohan Senapati and Radhanath Ray. His historical research includes all of the major Odia writings published during 1803 until 1920 which accentuate the British Raj and its impact in coastal Odisha, and a critical analysis of the modern Odia literature.

Notable works 
 Odia Sahityara Itihasa (1803-1920) (1964)
 Vyasakabi Fakirmohan (1957)
 Fakirmohan Sahitya Samiksha (1984)
 Kabyasrshti Manasa (1999)
 Radhanatha Rachanabali O Semananka Prakasa Samaya Nirnaya (The Dagara, XXIV, 6th and 7th number, 1960–61, p. 5)
 Radhanatha Sahitya Samikha Eka Adhayana (The Jhankar, VIII, 11th number, February 1957, p. 1062)
 Juga Prabarttak Radhanath

Research Books
 Byasakabi Fakirmohan - 1957 (Odisha Sahitya Academy Award) 
 Adhunika Odia Sahityara Digdarshan - 1859 
 Odia Vaishnava Sahitya - 1959 
 Jugaprabartaka Srasta Radhanath - 1960 (Odisha Sahitya Academy Award) 
 Gangadhara Sahitya Samikshya - 1960 
 Sahityadarsha - 1960 
 Radhanath O Chilika Kabya - 1960 
 Galpa Nuhen Samalochana - 1963 
 Odia Sahityara Itihasa (1803-1920) - 1963 (Ph.D Thesis) 
 Adhunika Odia Sahityara Bhittibhumi - 1964 
 Nandakishor Sahitya Samikhya - 1964 
 Odia Palli Sahitya - 1970 
 Odia Sahityaku Artaballavanka Dana - 1970 
 Badajena Sahitya Samokhya - 1971 
 Sakhahina Pancha Sakha - 1975 
 Mu Kipari Gabeshana Kali - 1976 
 Odia Sahityara Swara Paribartana - 1976 
 Odia Sahityara Kala O Kala - 1977 
 Odia Sahityare Samikhya O Sangraha - 1977 
 Adhunika Odia Sahiya Bikashara Prusthabhumi - 1979 
 Odishara Dharmadharare Panchasakha Parikalpana - 1982 
 Radhanath Sahitya Samikhya - 1984 
 Fakirmohan Sahitya Samikhya - 1984 
 Kabi Gopabandhunka Kabya Srusti Manasa: Eka Sarvekshana - 1999

After Death Publication
 Odia Bhasa Bilopa Andolana Ed. Dr. Smaran Kumar Nayak, Published by Jagannath Ratha, Binod Bihari, Cuttack, Odisha, India.

Awards 
 Atibadi Jagannath Das Award (1995)
 Odisha Sahitya Academy Award (1957-1958) for Vyasakabi Fakir Mohan
 Odisha Sahitya Academy Award (1959-1961) for Juga  Prabarttak Radhanath
 Sarala Award

References 

20th-century Indian writers
Odia-language writers
Recipients of the Odisha Sahitya Akademi Award
Recipients of the Atibadi Jagannath Das Award
Writers from Odisha
20th-century Indian male writers